Allan Akia (born 23 March 1973) is a Papua New Guinean sprinter. He competed in the men's 4 × 100 metres relay at the 1996 Summer Olympics.

References

External links

1973 births
Living people
Athletes (track and field) at the 1996 Summer Olympics
Papua New Guinean male sprinters
Olympic athletes of Papua New Guinea
Athletes (track and field) at the 1998 Commonwealth Games
Commonwealth Games competitors for Papua New Guinea